Zhang Wohua (1886 – 26 November 1938) was a Chinese politician.

Career
Zhang was a native of Fengyang County. He studied law at Meiji University in Japan, where he joined the Tongmenghui. Upon completing his education, Zhang taught law in Jilin and worked for the Shenzhou Daily, a Shanghai newspaper.

Zhang was elected to the first National Assembly in 1913, but was exiled to Shanghai soon after the Second Revolution. He was active in the Constitutional Protection Junta and participated in the Constitutional Protection Movement. Zhang remained a high-ranking assemblyman until 1925, when he was named director of the National Tobacco and Alcohol Affairs Department.

Zhang helped consolidate the Nationalist government in 1928, working for the Ministry of Foreign Affairs. He was appointed deputy foreign minister in October 1929. From April 1930, Zhang served dual appointments in the foreign and interior ministries. In December 1930, Zhang became acting interior minister. He retired from politics in 1932, and moved to Xuancheng.

Soon after the Second Sino-Japanese War broke out, Zhang organized a resistance movement against the Japanese. He was killed by a Japanese airstrike on 26 November 1938, aged 53.

References 

1886 births
1938 deaths
Interior Ministers of the Republic of China
Republic of China politicians from Anhui
Meiji University alumni
People killed in the Second Sino-Japanese War
Politicians from Chuzhou
Deaths by Japanese airstrikes
Deaths by airstrike during World War II
People from Fengyang